Naganuma (長沼) is at the westernmost part of Ninomiya, Tochigi Prefecture. The area is largely rural - rice and strawberry farming is the largest industry. The Kinugawa River marks the boundary of Naganuma (and so too, Ninomiya, Tochigi and Haga District, Tochigi).

Geography of Tochigi Prefecture